The Central States version of the NWA World Tag Team Championship was the main professional wrestling championship for tag teams in Heart of America Sports Attractions, later known as Central States Wrestling (CSW) from 1951 to 1959, then again from 1962 to 1963 and then finally from 1973 to 1979. CSW was a member of the National Wrestling Alliance (NWA), whose bylaws allowed any of their members, referred to as NWA territories, to create their own version of the NWA World Tag Team Championship that would be promoted within their territory. The Central States version was primarily defended in CSW's home town of Kansas City and during their shows across Missouri, Kansas and Iowa. As it was a professional wrestling championship, it was not won or lost competitively but instead by the decision of the bookers. The title was awarded after the chosen team "wins" a match to maintain the illusion that professional wrestling is a competitive sport. In 1957 there were at least 13 different versions of the NWA World Tag Team Championship being promoted in various NWA territories across the United States.

The Battling Duseks (Emil Dusek and Joe Dusek) were the first NWA World Tag Team Champions in the Hearts of America promotion. Records do not indicate if the Duseks won a tournament or were simply awarded the championship by the promoters prior to being presented as champions on May 26, 1950. Joe and Ernie Dusek would later hold the championship as well as the combination of Emil and Ernie holding the championship twice before the championship was abandoned in 1960. From 1960 to 1962 the championship was inactive and instead the NWA Central States Tag Team Championship was recognized as the main tag team championship in the territory. On October 10, 1962 Pat O'Connor and Sonny Myers defeated Bob Geigel and Lee Hennig to win the NWA World Tag Team Champions as the promoters brought the championship back. The second era of the championship lasted for around two years until it was abandoned in lieu of the newly created NWA North American Tag Team Championship around 1963. In 1973 CSW abandoned the North American championship and brought the NWA World Tag Team Championship back. Great Togo and Tokyo Joe defeated Bob Geigel and Rufus R. Jones to win the vacant championship. In 1979 Central States Wrestling once again abandoned the championship to permanently adopt the NWA Central States Tag Team Championship as their top tag team championship. Bob Brown and Bob Sweetan were the last holders of the NWA World Tag Team Championship.

Ernie and Joe Dusek teamed up to win a total of five tag team championships, the most of any team, followed by Emil and Ernie teaming up for a total of three championships as a unit. Ernie and Joe Dusek both held the championship a total of seven times, the most individual reigns. The longest reign of any of the three championships eras belongs to Ernie and Joe Dusek, who held the championship for at least 545 days from late 1956 to June 27, 1958. Due to lack of specific dates for many of the early championship changes it is impossible to clearly determine who had the shortest reign of any champion. The shortest confirmed reign was an eight-day reign for the team of Larry Hamilton and Sonny Myers from October 25 to November 2, 1956.

Title history

Team reigns by combined length
Key

Individual reigns by combined length
Key

See also
National Wrestling Alliance
NWA World Tag Team Championship
NWA Central States Tag Team Championship
NWA North American Tag Team Championship

Footnotes

Concurrent championships
Sources for 13 simultaneous NWA World Tag Team Championships
NWA World Tag Team Championship (Los Angeles version)
NWA World Tag Team Championship (San Francisco version)
NWA World Tag Team Championship (Central States version)
NWA World Tag Team Championship (Chicago version)
NWA World Tag Team Championship (Buffalo Athletic Club version)
NWA World Tag Team Championship (Georgia version)
NWA World Tag Team Championship (Iowa/Nebraska version)
NWA World Tag Team Championship (Indianapolis version)
NWA World Tag Team Championship (Salt Lake Wrestling Club version)
NWA World Tag Team Championship (Amarillo version)
NWA World Tag Team Championship (Minneapolis version)
NWA World Tag Team Championship (Texas version)
NWA World Tag Team Championship (Mid-America version)

References

Heart of America Sports Attractions championships
National Wrestling Alliance championships
Tag team wrestling championships
World professional wrestling championships